{{DISPLAYTITLE:C23H26N2O2}}
The molecular formula C23H26N2O2 (molar mass: 362.465 g/mol, exact mass: 362.1994 u) may refer to:

 Dexetimide
 Solifenacin

Molecular formulas